The following is a list of national roads in Kenya, under the jurisdiction of the Kenya National Highway Authority (KeNHA). KenHa classifies International Trunk Roads as Class ‘A’ and National Trunk Roads as Class ‘B’. The list is not exhaustive.

National roads

See also
Transport in Kenya

References

External links
 Webpage of Kenya National Highways Authority

Transport in Kenya
Economy of Kenya
Kenya
Roads
Roads